Glenida cyaneipennis is a species of beetle in the family Cerambycidae. It was described by Charles Joseph Gahan in 1888. It is known from Taiwan and China.

Subspecies
 Glenida cyaneipennis cyaneipennis Gahan, 1888
 Glenida cyaneipennis ikedai Mitono, 1939

References

Saperdini
Beetles described in 1888